A list of animated feature films released in 2006

Highest-grossing animated films of the year

See also
 List of animated television series of 2006

Bibliography

References

 Feature films
2006
2006-related lists